Munich East station (also called München Ostbahnhof in regional services) is a railway station in Munich, the state capital of Bavaria, Germany. It opened as Haidhausen station in 1871 on the new Munich–Mühldorf and Munich–Rosenheim railway lines. The station is operated by DB Station&Service, a subsidiary of Deutsche Bahn AG, and is classified as a Category 1 station, one of 21 in Germany and two in Munich, the other being München Hauptbahnhof. It is the city's third interregional station besides München Hauptbahnhof in the city centre and München-Pasing in the west.

History 
A first station, built according to plans designed by Friedrich Bürklein, was inaugurated on 1 May 1871 as part of the newly built railway line to Neuötting via Mühldorf am Inn. The line to Rosenheim opened on 15 October 1871. Initially named Haidhausen after the eponymous quarter, it received its present name München Ost on 15 October 1876. The station was given additional significance as a railway hub with the opening of the Munich East–Deisenhofen line in 1898; followed by train connections to Ismaning and Schwabing in 1909, the first to be electrified in 1927.

The station was severely damaged by the bombing of Munich on 24/25 April 1944 and had to be entirely rebuilt after World War II. A provisional counter hall was erected in 1952. A motorail (Autoreisezug) yard opened on 22 June 1959.

In May 1972, shortly before the Summer Olympics, Munich East became part of the Munich S-Bahn network as eastern terminus of the Stammstrecke to Munich Pasing in the west. The present-day entrance building was erected in 1985. Three years later, in 1988, the station also received access to the Munich U-Bahn network. Further refurbishments of the station building took place in 1999 and in 2008.

Operational usage 
The station has 17 tracks. Tracks 1–5 are used by the S-Bahn, tracks 6–8 and 11–14 are used by regional and interregional traffic.
Tracks 9, 10 and 15 are through tracks.
Tracks 16 and 17 are used by Motorail.

Mainly InterCity as well as international EuroCity and Railjet services via Rosenheim to Salzburg and Innsbruck in Austria, to Italy and Southeastern Europe depart from this station. Some ICE services to Vienna and Innsbruck also stop here.

Several Regional-Express and Regionalbahn services depart from Munich East to many destinations in Chiemgau and southeastern Bavaria. Trains are operated by the SüdostBayernBahn network of Deutsche Bahn AG as well as by the private Bayerische Oberlandbahn railway company (Meridian).

S-Bahn 
The Ostbahnhof (the name of the S-Bahn part of the station) was refurbished under the Takt 10 project.  As an endpoint of the backbone tunnel of Munich's S-Bahn system all lines pass through the station, except S20.  Lines S2, S4, S6 and S8 continue via platform 5 further east.

The lines S3 and S7 change direction at platform 4 and continue further south to Giesing.
The trains to the tunnel depart from platforms 1-3.

U-Bahn 
Since 1988 there is a U-Bahn service to Ostbahnhof by the line U5.  It continues south to Neuperlach Süd via Innsbrucker Ring and west to Laimer Platz via Max-Weber-Platz, Hauptbahnhof and Theresienwiese.
The line services the station every ten minutes (five in rush-hours).

Tramway 
The Ostbahnhof stop of the Munich tramway is located on Orleansplatz, and served by route 21.

Train services
The station is served by the following services:

RailJet services Munich - Salzburg - Linz - St Pölten - Vienna - Győr - Budapest

Gallery

References 

Ostbahnhof
Ost
Railway stations in Germany opened in 1871
Ost